Insanely Twisted Shadow Planet is a shooter puzzle video game developed by Shadow Planet Productions (Fuelcell Games/Gagne International) and published by Microsoft Studios for Xbox 360 and Microsoft Windows. A self-published DRM-free version with soundtrack included was featured in the Humble Indie Bundle 13.

Development

The game is a collaboration between animator Michel Gagné and game designer Joe Olsen and takes inspiration from Gagné's "Insanely Twisted Shadow Puppets", a series of interstitials he did for Nickelodeon in 2005. The two first met when Gagné was giving a workshop for Midway Games in Seattle, and Olsen, having seen the Nickelodeon shorts, asked Gagné if he'd be interested in collaborating. Gagné was unfamiliar with the medium, only knowing games up to 1993's Doom; however, he was eager and told Olson that he'd do research and get back to him. Olson, however, saw Gagne's nativity as an asset and told him that he would provide help from the gameplay side. Olsen stated he "wanted to use the power of modern consoles to drive feature-quality animation." Initially the team worked on the game in their spare time, which led to them working on the game "only about three or four days a month" leading them to eventually quit their day jobs in order to focus on Shadow Planet full time  The team consisting of Gagné, Olson and Olson's development team initially worked out of a basement. Development began in 2007  and most of 2008 was spent with the group performing contract work in order to be able to rent an office.
   
The game was eventually picked up by Microsoft, Microsoft had originally passed after seeing an early prototype however after the release of the second trailer they changed their mind. The game was first demonstrated in March 2011 at Penny Arcade Expo East. The game is set on an alien planet and includes exploration elements similar to Metroidvania. Insanely Twisted Shadow Planet was released on August 3, 2011. The game features music by Dimmu Borgir during cinematics; the songs "Progenies of the Great Apocalypse" (orchestral version) and "Eradication Instincts Defined" play during the game, while the trailer featured "Blood Hunger Doctrine".

Expansions 
The Shadow Hunters expansion was released on Xbox Live Arcade on October 12, 2011. It expands on the Lantern Run mode in the base game, allowing players to team up in a continuation of the storyline. Shadow Hunters was included for free in the PC port of the game. Local and online multiplayer are supported in Lantern Run and the Shadow Hunters DLC.

Reception 

The PC and Xbox 360 versions received "generally favorable reviews" according to the review aggregation website Metacritic. Jim Sterling of Destructoid noted the Xbox 360 version as an "attempt to run in multiple directions at once and make very little ground at all" and concluded: "Sadly, great visuals do not make a great game."

Justin Clouse of The Escapist gave the same console version a score of four stars out of five and called it "good fun, with striking visuals and a great setting. A few issues keep it from being totally brilliant though." Liam Martin of Digital Spy gave it a similar score of four stars, saying, "The stylish visuals compliment the well-executed action, resulting in a game that resembles past SOA favorites Limbo and Shadow Complex." Todd Vote of 411Mania gave it a score of 7.8 out of 10, calling it "a very unique take on the old formula of side scrolling shooters. While it doesn't really do anything wrong, aside from the art style, it doesn't really do anything to stand out either. It is a fun engaging experience, but once you are done with the game, that is all she wrote. There is not really much incentive to go back and keep playing other than a less than exciting Lantern Runs. The game ends up being satisfying, but falling shy of being incredible in most parts." Christian Williams of The A.V. Club gave it a B, saying, "While the campaign could use more of that urgency, ITSP is a perfectly polished, bite-size shooter that returns us, however briefly, to a long-neglected sector of the gaming universe." However, Roger Hargeaves of Metro gave it six out of ten, saying, "It copies and borrows from the best - and often very well - but competence is no substitute for character in this forgettable 2D adventure." Dan Lee from The Sixth Axis gave it a ten out of ten score, concluding: "Stunning to look at, wonderfully crafted environments and challenging puzzles all add up to an experience you really shouldn’t miss out on." The  game received a 8.5/10 from the review aggregation website, N4G, which features video game reviews from around the world.

Awards 
British Academy Award (BAFTA) for Best Debut Game

Annie Award for Best Animated Game

Navigatr (National Academy of Video Game Testers and Reviewers) for Best Original Light Mix Score

Video Game Award (nomination) for Best Downloadable

Interactive Achievement Award (nomination) for Best Downloadable

Annual Game Music Award (nomination) Outstanding Achievement Licensed Music (Dimmu Borgir)

References

External links
 Official blog
 

2011 video games
Games for Windows certified games
Microsoft games
Multidirectional shooters
Video games developed in the United States
Xbox 360 Live Arcade games
Xbox 360 games
Windows games
MacOS games
Linux games
Multiplayer and single-player video games
Video games set on fictional planets
Video games with silhouette graphics
Metroidvania games
British Academy Games Award for Debut Game winners
Annie Award for Best Animated Video Game winners